Megachile microdontura is a species of bee in the family Megachilidae. It was described by Theodore Dru Alison Cockerell in 1927.

References

Microdontura
Insects described in 1927